Thallavellamla is a village panchayat in Chityal mandal in Nalgonda district in the state of Telangana in India.

Villages in Nalgonda district